Keith Francis Arnold Beal is an English painter, sound engineer, recording engineer and producer, musician and composer, and author.

Early years 
Born on 22 December 1933 in Chalfont St. Peter, Buckinghamshire, Beal grew up in Potters Bar, Hertfordshire. After the Second World War, he was sent to Sweden in 1948 to gain strength, staying there for the better part of a year. His formative years were spent in NW London, where he went to school, and in Hamstead, where he explored his interest in painting, which had been instigated in childhood by his painter father.

Painting 
In 1955 Beal spent a year in Paris, aiming to develop his painting skills. On returning to England he found quick success, having an exhibition in a gallery in Bond Street and selling out on the day. Beal has remained actively interested in painting throughout his life. The Miguel de Cervantes novel Don Quixote has been a recurring inspiration for his paintings.

Sound engineer 
Beal worked as a sound engineer and technician for the BBC, as well as commercial television, and freelance in the film business from 1956 to 1973.

University 
Beal studied at the London School of Economics, gaining a BSc degree in Economics in 1971.
He also studied at Sussex University, gaining an MA in Music and the Sonic Arts in 2013

Music 
On his fortieth birthday in 1973, he acquired a saxophone, and won a bet that he could learn to play it within a year.
In 1974, he co-founded Ogun Records, a record label specialising in jazz and modern classical music.
Initially, he worked as a recording engineer and editor, but later became a producer, eventually leading the company as managing director. In his time at Ogun, Beal recorded and/or produced some 50 records by such artists as Trevor Watts, Chris McGregor's Brotherhood of Breath, Elton Dean, Harry Becket, John Surman and Keith Tippett.
After leaving Ogun in 1980 Beal concentrated on playing the saxophone. He toured extensively with Trevor Watts Moiré Music, an avant garde jazz ensemble, playing at most of the European Jazz Festivals between 1982 and 1986.

Since 1987 Beal has divided his time between England and the Netherlands. Initially focusing on jazz, both as a performer and composer, he has increasingly moved towards modern classical composition. Early works include pieces for tuba quartet and saxophone quartet, but he became ever more confident and productive, writing 6 symphonies and 4 concertos, recording his Second Symphony in Kyiv with the Kyiv Modern Symphony Orchestra in 2001, and writing a clarinet concerto to be performed by Alan Hacker. He went on to compose two operas: Dulcinea was written on the 400th anniversary of the Miguel de Cervantes novel Don Quixote, on which the libretto is based, while Merlin has a libretto based on a compilation of myths around Le Morte d'Arthur characters Merlin and Nimue. He has also composed three ballets; the music of which has been played, but not yet danced.

Novels 
In 2011 and 2012, Beal published two strongly autobiographical novels, entitled Counterpoint in Three Parts: Reflexions on the Life and Loves of a Musician' based on the experiences of a touring musician'

, and Cadmium Red', based on painting and politics in Paris of the 1950s'

Compositions 
The following is an as yet incomplete overview of Beal's major compositions.

Symphonies

Concertos

Operas and ballets

Miscellaneous orchestral pieces

References

External links 
Keith Beal's personal website – work in progress

1933 births
Living people
English jazz saxophonists
20th-century English painters
English male painters
21st-century English painters
21st-century English male artists
English male writers
English record producers
English audio engineers
English composers
Alumni of the London School of Economics
Alumni of the University of Sussex
20th-century English male artists